Áed Ua Cáellaide (sometimes Anglicised to Edan O'Kelly) was a bishop in Ireland during the 12th century: he was Bishop of Clogher  from 1139 to his death on 29 March 1182- for the bulk of his episcopacy he was known as the Bishop of Louth.

References

12th-century Roman Catholic bishops in Ireland
Pre-Reformation bishops of Clogher
1182 deaths
Bishops of Louth